Hughlette Wheeler (April 24, 1901 – December 25, 1955) was an American sculptor.

He grew up on a ranch in north-central Florida. At age 24 he matriculated at the Cleveland Institute of Art for sculpture, having had no prior experience but showing natural aptitude. His first student works were purchased by Cleveland book store owners Korner & Wood.

His work was part of the sculpture event in the art competition at the 1932 Summer Olympics.

References

1901 births
1955 deaths
20th-century American sculptors
American male sculptors
Olympic competitors in art competitions
People from Orange County, Florida
20th-century American male artists